The Ligier JS P217 is a Le Mans Prototype built by Onroak Automotive and named in a partnership with French racing driver Guy Ligier. The Ligier JS P217 was built to meet the 2017 FIA and ACO regulations for 2017 for the LMP2 category in the FIA World Endurance Championship. The car also meets the regulations for the International Motor Sports Association’s (IMSA) WeatherTech SportsCar Championship for the Prototype class. It is  active in both these championship series as well as the European Le Mans Series and Asian Le Mans Series in 2017. The prototype made its racing debut at the 2017 24 Hours of Daytona and its FIA World Endurance Championship debut at the 6 Hours of Spa-Francorchamps.

Development

The Liger JS P217 was conceived in 2016 in preparation for the FIA and ACO's new regulation changes in 2017.  Onroak Automotive built a brand new chassis from scratch and focused on improving the mechanics of the car from the Ligier JS P2. Onroak and technical partners focused on the air cooling of the engine radiators and brakes and cockpit air conditioning. The  mechanical features of the car that were concentrated on was the implementation of a new axle, nut, and rim to lessen the time of tire changes, the efficiency of the axles, weight distribution, accessibility of mechanics at the front of the cockpit, aerodynamic efficiency, LMP1 style power steering, and a limited number of chassis pieces. The driver's comfort, space, controls accessibility, and visibility also was paid attention to as well.

The car was unveiled at Spa-Francorchamps publicly in September 2016. It also performed tests at Magny-Cours in September 2016 and Daytona International Speedway in November 2016 for preparation for the 24 Hours of Daytona.

Nissan Onroak DPi

A variation of the prototype, the Nissan Onroak DPi, also known as the Ligier Nissan DPi, was created for the IMSA's WeatherTech SportsCar Championship Prototype class under the DPi regulations. The car was developed in partnership with Nissan and Nismo. The powerplant of the vehicle is a 3.8 litre V6 twin-turbo engine from the Nissan GT-R GT3. Other alterations from the P217 include a large front panel and revised side panels. Onroak Automotive supplied Tequila Patrón ESM with two prototypes for the WeatherTech SportsCar Championship. ESM ran the DPi until closing due to a lack of sponsorship in late 2018. CORE Autosport would purchase the ESM DPis and run them for the 2019 season. The program would not continue due to the retirement of team owner Jon Bennett.

Complete FIA World Endurance Championship results 
Results in bold indicate pole position. Results in italics indicate fastest lap.

Complete European Le Mans Series results 
Results in bold indicate pole position. Results in italics indicate fastest lap.

Complete Asian Le Mans Series results 
Results in bold indicate pole position. Results in italics indicate fastest lap.

Complete IMSA SportsCar Championship results 
Results in bold indicate pole position. Results in italics indicate fastest lap.

Race Victories

References

External links

 

Le Mans Prototypes
24 Hours of Le Mans race cars
Ligier racing cars